Summers Glacier is a tributary glacier that drains the vicinity west of Latino Peak and flows south to enter Pearl Harbor Glacier, in the Victory Mountains, Victoria Land. Mapped by United States Geological Survey (USGS) from surveys and U.S. Navy air photos, 1960–64. Named by Advisory Committee on Antarctic Names (US-ACAN) for James L. Summers, U.S. Navy, chief utilitiesman at McMurdo Station, 1967.

Glaciers of Victoria Land
Borchgrevink Coast